Henry Wilfrid Brambell (22 March 1912 – 18 January 1985) was an Irish television and film actor, best remembered for playing the grubby rag-and-bone man Albert Steptoe alongside Harry H. Corbett in the long-running BBC television sitcom Steptoe and Son (1962–65, 1970–74). He achieved international recognition in 1964 for his appearance alongside the Beatles in A Hard Day's Night, playing the fictional grandfather of Paul McCartney.

Early life

Brambell was born in Dublin, the youngest of three sons born to Henry Lytton Brambell (1870–1937), a cashier at the Guinness Brewery, and his wife, Edith Marks (1879–1965), a former opera singer. The family surname was changed from "Bramble" by Wilfrid's grandfather Frederick William Brambell. His two older brothers were Frederick Edward Brambell (1905–1980) and James Christopher Marks "Jim" Brambell (1907–1992).

His first appearance was as a child, entertaining the wounded troops during the First World War. After leaving school, he worked part-time as a reporter for The Irish Times and part-time as an actor at the Abbey Theatre before becoming a professional actor for the Gate Theatre. He also did repertory at Swansea, Bristol and Chesterfield. In the Second World War, he joined the British military forces entertainment organisation ENSA.

Acting career

Brambell had roles in film and television from 1947, first appearing (uncredited) in Odd Man Out as a tram passenger. His television career began during the 1950s, when he was cast in small roles in three Nigel Kneale/Rudolph Cartier productions for BBC Television: as a drunk in The Quatermass Experiment (1953), as both an old man in a pub and later a prisoner in Nineteen Eighty-Four (1954), and as a tramp in Quatermass II (1955). 

All of these roles earned him a reputation for playing old men, though he was only in his forties at the time. He appeared in the short film series Scotland Yard in the episode, "The Grand Junction Case". He appeared as Bill Gaye in the 1962 Maurice Chevalier/Hayley Mills picture, In Search of the Castaways. He was heard on the original London cast recording of the long-running West End stage musical The Canterbury Tales in which he starred at London's Phoenix Theatre..

He also released two 45-rpm singles, "Second Hand"/"Rag Time Ragabone Man", that played on his Steptoe and Son character, followed in 1971 by "Time Marches On", his tribute to the Beatles.

Brambell was featured in many prominent theatre roles. In 1966, he played Ebenezer Scrooge in a musical version of A Christmas Carol. This was adapted for radio the same year, and appeared on Radio 2 on Christmas Eve. Brambell's booming baritone voice surprised many listeners: he played the role straight, true to the Dickens original, and not in the stereotype Albert Steptoe character. In 1971, he starred in the premiere of Eric Chappell's play, The Banana Box, in which he played Rooksby. This part was later renamed Rigsby for the television adaptation called Rising Damp, with Leonard Rossiter replacing Brambell in the role. Brambell also played Bert Thomson, an Irish widower, in the film Holiday on the Buses; the character in question started a close friendship with Stan Butler's mother, Mabel.

Steptoe and Son and A Hard Day's Night
It was this ability to play old men that led to his casting in his best remembered role as Albert Steptoe, the irascible father in Steptoe and Son, a man who – when the series began – was said to be in his sixties, even though Brambell was only aged 50 in 1962 (thirteen years older than Harry H. Corbett, who played his son Harold). The series began as a pilot on the BBC's Comedy Playhouse, and its success led to the commissioning of a full series. It ran from 1962 to 1974, including a five-year hiatus. A constant thread throughout the series was Albert being referred to by Harold as a "dirty old man"; for example, when he was eating pickled onions while taking a bath, and retrieving dropped onions from the bathwater. There were also two feature film spin-offs, a stage show and an American incarnation titled Sanford and Son, some episodes of which were almost exact remakes of the original British scripts.

The success of Steptoe and Son made Brambell a high-profile figure on British television, and earned him the supporting role of Paul McCartney's grandfather in the Beatles' first film, A Hard Day's Night (1964). A running joke is made throughout the film of his character being "a very clean old man", in contrast to his being referred to as a "dirty old man" in Steptoe and Son. In real life, he was indeed nothing like his Steptoe persona, being dapper and well-spoken. He notably spoke with a distinct received pronunciation accent, in strong contrast to both his Steptoe cockney accent, and his native Irish accent which he would use where the role dictated. In 1965, Brambell told the BBC that he did not want to do another series of Steptoe and Son, and in September that year, he went to New York City to appear in the Broadway musical Kelly at the Broadhurst Theatre. It closed after a single performance.

Apart from his role as the older Steptoe, Brambell achieved recognition in many films. His performance in The Terence Davies Trilogy (1983) won him critical acclaim. Although he appears throughout the full 24-minute piece, Brambell does not speak a single word.

Personal and later life
After the final series of Steptoe and Son concluded in 1974, Brambell had some guest roles in films and on television. He and Harry H. Corbett also undertook a tour of Australia in 1977 in a stage production based on Steptoe and Son. In 1982, a tearful Brambell appeared on BBC news paying tribute to Corbett, after the latter's death from a heart attack. In 1982, Brambell appeared in Terence Davies's film Death and Transfiguration, playing a dying elderly man who finally comes to terms with his homosexuality.

In 2002, Channel 4 broadcast a documentary film, When Steptoe Met Son, about the off-screen life of Brambell and his relationship with Corbett. The film claimed that the two men detested each other and were barely on speaking terms after the Australian tour. The rift was apparently caused in part by Brambell's alcoholism, and led to the pair leaving the country on separate planes. This claim is disputed by the writers of Steptoe and Son, Ray Galton and Alan Simpson, who were unaware of any hatred or conflict. Corbett's nephew released a statement in which he claimed that the actors did not hate each other: "We can categorically say they did not fall out. They were together for nearly a year in Australia, went on several sightseeing trips together, and left the tour at the end on different planes because Harry was going on holiday with his family, not because he refused to get on the same plane." They continued to work together after the Australian tour on radio and adverts, with it being generally accepted that the relationship between the two actors was under its greatest strain during the tour, though Brambell and Corbett soon settled their differences "fairly amicably", and in the spring of 1978 performed a short BBC radio sketch entitled Scotch on the Rocks.Comedy Chronicles – Strained Relationships: Wilfrid Brambell & Harry H Corbett McCann, Graham. www.comedy.co.uk, 23 August 2020. Retrieved 12 March 2021.

Brambell was a gay man at a time when male homosexual acts were illegal in England and Wales until 1967. In 1962, he was arrested in a toilet in Shepherd's Bush for persistently importuning and given a conditional discharge.

He was married to Mary "Molly" Josephine Hall from 1948 to 1955. The relationship ended in divorce after she gave birth to their lodger's baby in 1955.

Death
Brambell died of cancer at his home in Westminster, London, aged 72, on 18 January 1985. He was cremated on 25 January 1985 at Streatham Park Cemetery, where his ashes were scattered. Just six people attended his funeral: his brother, his partner, Galton and Simpson, a BBC representative, and Maureen Corbett, the widow of Harry H. Corbett.

LegacyThe Curse of Steptoe, a BBC television play about Brambell and his co-star Harry H. Corbett, was broadcast on 19 March 2008 on digital BBC channel BBC Four, featuring Phil Davis as Brambell. The first broadcast gained the channel its highest audience figures to date, based on overnight returns.

Filmography

 References 

Further reading
 Brambell, (Henry) Wilfrid (1912–1985), David Parkinson, Oxford Dictionary of National Biography'', Oxford University Press, 2004

External links
 
 
 

1912 births
1985 deaths
Deaths from cancer in England
Irish expatriates in the United Kingdom
Irish male film actors
Irish male stage actors
Irish male television actors
Irish male comedians
Irish gay actors
People from Ranelagh
People convicted for homosexuality in the United Kingdom
20th-century Irish male actors
20th-century Irish comedians
20th-century Irish LGBT people
Burials at Streatham Park Cemetery